Chit Anbeh (also Romanized as Chīt Anbeh; also known as Chitamba, Chītambū, Chīt Anbūh, and Chīt Boneh) is a village in Meydavud Rural District, Meydavud District, Bagh-e Malek County, Khuzestan Province, Iran. At the 2006 census, its population was 1,189, in 253 families.

Chitanbeh is famous for its Rice so called Champa. Main families in this riverside village are Kolahkaj, Davoodi, Asghari, Abdali, Choromi, Mosavi and some new who came to this calm and growing village in 2009.

References 

Chitanbeh is famous for its Rice so called Champa. Main families in this riverside village are Kolahkaj, Davoodi, Asghari, Abdali, Choromi, Mosavi and...

Populated places in Bagh-e Malek County